The Tatuus FA010 is an open-wheel race car, designed, developed, and built by Italian chassis manufacturer Tatuus, for the Formula Abarth series, and later the Formula Masters China series, between 2010 and 2011.

References

External links
 Tatuus website
 

Open wheel racing cars
Cars introduced in 2010